Roanoke is an unincorporated community in Howard and Randolph counties, in the U.S. state of Missouri.

History
The first settlement at Roanoke was made in 1836.  The community took its name from Roanoke Plantation, in Virginia, the native state of a first settler. A post office was established on the Randolph County side in 1838, where it remained in operation until it was discontinued in 1871.

The Finks-Harvey Plantation was listed on the National Register of Historic Places in 1978.

References

Unincorporated communities in Missouri
Unincorporated communities in Howard County, Missouri
Unincorporated communities in Randolph County, Missouri